Gustavo Lazzaretti de Araújo, known as Gustavo (born 9 March 1984 in Curitiba), is a Brazilian retired footballer who played as a central defender. He also holds an Italian passport.

External links

1984 births
Footballers from Curitiba
Living people
Brazilian footballers
Brazilian people of Italian descent
Association football defenders
J. Malucelli Futebol players
Botafogo de Futebol e Regatas players
Club Athletico Paranaense players
Sport Club do Recife players
Associação Atlética Ponte Preta players
Associação Portuguesa de Desportos players
Chelsea F.C. players
Serie A players
Sharjah FC players
Udinese Calcio players
Treviso F.B.C. 1993 players
Campeonato Brasileiro Série A players
Primeira Liga players
Vitória S.C. players
Brazilian expatriate footballers
Expatriate footballers in England
Expatriate footballers in Italy
Expatriate footballers in Portugal
Expatriate footballers in the United Arab Emirates
UAE Pro League players